George Garvin Brown IV (born 1969/1970) is a Canadian businessman and the current Chairman of the spirits company Brown-Forman, which owns brands including Jack Daniel's whiskey, Finlandia vodka and Herradura tequila. Brown-Forman was founded by his great-grandfather George Garvin Brown in 1870.

The Brown family owns approximately 51% of Brown-Forman, and at least 25 family members share a fortune estimated at $12.3 billion.

Early life
He is the son of George Garvin Brown III (d.2010) and his first wife, Susan Casey Brown, of Montreal.

Brown grew up in Montreal, his mother's hometown, with his brother Campbell Brown, and his parents later divorced. He received a 
bachelor's degree from McGill University, and a master's degree (MBA) from the London Business School.

Career
Brown was Chairman of Brown-Forman from 2007 until 2021, when we has succeeded by Campbell P. Brown.

Personal life
Brown married his wife, from Toronto, in 1996, and they have children together.

References

Brown–Forman people
Living people
Year of birth missing (living people)